Texas v. New Mexico, 592 U.S. ___ (2020), is a long-running United States Supreme Court case between the U.S. states of Texas and New Mexico regarding the Pecos River Compact. It was decided on December 14, 2020.

Background 
In 2014, heavy rainfall brought by Tropical Storm Odile dumped large amounts of water into the Pecos River basin. This resulted in the Brantley Dam along the Pecos River being unable to hold all of the water and it was released downstream. Texas then emptied 40,000 acre-feet of water from its Red Bluff Reservoir to accommodate the flow. New Mexico holds that the unused water counts toward Texas' allotment under the Pecos River Compact; Texas disputes this.

References

External links 
 

United States Supreme Court cases
United States Supreme Court cases of the Roberts Court
2020 in United States case law
Pecos River
United States water case law